Clepsis senecionana, the rustic tortrix, is a moth of the family Tortricidae. It is found from Europe to eastern Siberia.

The wingspan is 13–16 mm. The forewings are slightly pointed, light grey-brown with fine, reddish-brown crosslines. The hindwings are grey-brown. 

Adults are on wing from May to June. It flies in warm sunshine during the afternoon and evening, disappearing when the sky becomes cloudy.

The larvae feed on Convallaria, Dorycnium, Gentianella amarella, Lotus, Lysimachia, Myrica, Polygonatum, Onobrychis viccifolia  and Vaccinium myrtillus. In Scotland it has also been recorded on Picea, Pinus  and Larix. On conifers, the larvae mine into leaves and buds of young trees, causing shoot dieback and multi-leaders.

References

External links
 Eurasian Tortricidae
 UK Moths

Clepsis
Moths of Europe
Moths of Asia
Moths described in 1819